Matti Akseli Kuusi (25 March 1914 in Helsinki – 16 January 1998 in Helsinki) was a Finnish folklorist, paremiographer and paremiologist. He wrote several books and a number of articles on Finnish folklore. He was the first to have introduced the type system of proverbs similar to the Aarne–Thompson classification system of folklore, the Matti Kuusi international type system of proverbs. With encouragement from Archer Taylor he founded the journal Proverbium: Bulletin d'Information sur les Recherches Parémiologiques, published from 1965 to 1975 by the Society for Finnish Literature, which was later restarted as Proverbium: International Yearbook of Proverb Scholarship. He was a member of the noble family Granfelt, but his father had fennicized his original Swedish surname to express his political sympathies.

During his study period in the 1930s, Matti Kuusi was involved with nationalist political organizations. In the 1950s, he was appointed as the Professor of Folklore in the University of Helsinki, and later as the member of the Academy of Finland, becoming a nationally celebrated intellectual.

He led the effort to produce a collection of "900 Balto-Finnic Proverb Types with Russian, Baltic, German and Scandinavian Parallels", described as one of the "major multilingual proverb dictionaries". Although his personal research specialties were Finnish epic poetry and proverbs, he developed the folklore studies in Finland by encouraging research of urban legends and pop-lore. He took also interest in African folklore.

The international proverb typology developed by Kuusi along with its database of proverbs is available online.
 
Kuusi's interest in the study of proverbs has been continued by his daughter, Outi Lauhakangas.

Among the scientific achievements of Matti Kuusi, one of the most influential has been the rough chronology he established for the various layers of Finnish epics, based on stylistic analysis, motifs and comparisons with Old Scandinavian and Russian epics.

He is buried in the Hietaniemi Cemetery in Helsinki.

References

Related literature
Kaivola-Bregenhøj, Annikki. "Matti Akseli Kuusi (1914-1998)." Fabula 40.1/2 (1999): 114ff.

External links
 Kuusi and his daughter's work
 In Memory of the Last Giant of International Paremiology

1914 births
1998 deaths
Writers from Helsinki
People from Uusimaa Province (Grand Duchy of Finland)
20th-century Finnish nobility
Finnish writers
Finnish military personnel of World War II
University of Helsinki alumni
Academic staff of the University of Helsinki
Members of the Estonian Academy of Sciences
Burials at Hietaniemi Cemetery
Proverb scholars
Recipients of the Order of the White Star, 3rd Class